"Shiver" was a single by American R&B singer George Benson, which entered the UK Singles Chart on 29 November 1986. It reached a peak position of #19, and remained in the chart for 9 weeks. It was written by Narada Michael Walden, Preston Glass and Suzanne Valentine.

References 

George Benson songs
1986 singles
Warner Records singles
1986 songs
Songs written by Preston Glass
Songs written by Narada Michael Walden